Incus Records is a British record company and label founded by Derek Bailey, Tony Oxley, Evan Parker and Michael Walters that specializes in free jazz and improvised music.

The first release on the label was Incus Number 0 (zero), a 7 “ record with AMM LIVE, after that came Incus Number 1, The Topography of the Lungs, recorded by Bailey, Parker, and percussionist Han Bennink in 1970. Walters and Oxley left the label shortly after its founding, after which it continued as a partnership between Bailey and Parker until a falling-out between the two men in the mid-1980s. Parker left in 1987. Bailey continued the label with Karen Brookman until his death in 2005. Its first CD release was CYRO, a duo recording of Bailey and percussionist Cyro Baptista. 
In later years the label has issued videos and limited-edition CDRs intended largely for friends and faithful collectors. It relaunched with a new website and a full catalogue in early 2009.

Aside from recordings by Bailey and Parker (who also produced), the Incus catalogue includes the work of Barry Guy, Howard Riley, Kenny Wheeler, Steve Lacy, and John Zorn.

At various times since 1985, Incus Records sponsored festivals of improvised music in London.

Discography

See also
 List of record labels

References

External links
 Official site
 'Audio ad' for Incus featuring Derek Bailey

Free improvisation
Jazz record labels
British jazz record labels
British independent record labels
Record labels established in 1970